A Big Mac is a hamburger from the fast food chain McDonald's. 

Big Mac may also refer to:

People
Big Mac (nickname), a list of people with the nickname

Arts, entertainment, and media

Fictional entities
Big Mac (Casualty), a character from the UK medical drama Casualty
Big Mac (McDonald's character), an advertising character from the fictional McDonaldland world
Big Mac (TUGS), a character from the children's television series TUGS
Big Macintosh or Big Mac, a recurring character in the cartoon series My Little Pony: Friendship is Magic

Other arts, entertainment, and media
Big Mac (computer game), a series on the Commodore 64 platform
"Big Mac" (M*A*S*H), an episode of the TV series M*A*S*H
The Baseball Encyclopedia, also known as The MacMillan Baseball Encyclopedia or Big Mac, a 1969 reference work

Computing and technology
Big Mac (supercomputer), a supercomputer created by Virginia Tech in 2003 
Big Media Access Control, a 100 Mbit Ethernet adapter used in Sun Microsystems workstations and servers
"BigMac" or "Big Mac", a cancelled successor to the Macintosh developed at Apple from 1984 to 1985

Structures
Daniel Carter Beard Bridge, a span crossing the Ohio River, U.S.
Mackinac Bridge, a span connecting the peninsulas of Michigan, U.S.
McNichols Sports Arena, an indoor facility in Denver, Colorado, U.S.
Oklahoma State Penitentiary, a prison in McAlester, Oklahoma, U.S.

Other uses
Big Mac Index
McMillan TAC-50 sniper rifle
Municipal Assistance Corporation, which dealt with the New York City fiscal crisis of the 1970s
 , a US Navy destroyer nicknamed "Big Mac"

See also
Big Mack (disambiguation)
Little Mac (disambiguation)
Mac (disambiguation)
"Little Big Mac", an internal name for Apple's Macintosh II project